The 228 Hand-in-Hand rally was a demonstration in the form of a human chain held in Taiwan on February 28, 2004, the 57th anniversary of the February 28 Incident.

This demonstration was inspired by Baltic Way, the human chain comprising two million that was organized in the Baltic states in 1989. Although billed as "non-political", the event was organized by the Pan-Green Coalition and took place only a few weeks before the 2004 ROC presidential election. Some of the symbolism of the demonstration, particularly at the point in the event where participants "turn away from China" veered clearly toward support of Taiwanese independence, and hence was not attended by members of the Pan-Blue Coalition who countered the demonstration with an island-wide rally of their own days later.

See also
 Catalan Way
 Wild Lily student movement
 Sunflower Student Movement

External links

Hand-in-Hand Taiwan Alliance — official site

February 28 incident
2004 in Taiwan
Protests in Taiwan
Politics of Taiwan
Protest marches
February 2004 events in Asia
Human chains (politics)